Jiří Lehečka was the defending champion but chose not to defend his title.

Zsombor Piros won the title after defeating Harold Mayot 6–2, 1–6, 6–4 in the final.

Seeds

Draw

Finals

Top half

Bottom half

References

External links
Main draw
Qualifying draw

Tampere Open - 1
2022 Singles